Edvandro de Souza Cruz (born July 19, 1978 in Ilhabela, São Paulo) is a male cyclist from Brazil who specializes in competitive mountain biking. Cruz represented his native South American country at the 2004 Summer Olympics in Athens, where he finished in 33rd position. A year earlier he was runner-up behind Jeremiah Bishop at the 2003 Pan American Games.

Physical Build
Cruz is 5 feet, 6.5 inches tall and weighs 126 pounds.

References

1978 births
Living people
Brazilian male cyclists
Brazilian mountain bikers
Cross-country mountain bikers
Cyclists at the 2003 Pan American Games
Cyclists at the 2004 Summer Olympics
Olympic cyclists of Brazil
Sportspeople from São Paulo (state)
Pan American Games silver medalists for Brazil
Pan American Games medalists in cycling
Medalists at the 2003 Pan American Games
21st-century Brazilian people
20th-century Brazilian people